The women's double sculls event at the 2020 Summer Olympics is scheduled took place from 23 to 28 July 2021 at the Sea Forest Waterway. 26 rowers from 13 nations competed.

Background

This was the 12th appearance of the event, which has been held every year since women's rowing was introduced in 1976.

The reigning Olympic medalists were Poland, Great Britain, and Lithuania. Lithuania was the only team to qualify.

Qualification

Each National Olympic Committee (NOC) was limited to a single boat in the event. There were 13 qualifying places in the women's single sculls:

 11 from the 2019 World Championship
 2 from the final qualification regatta

The COVID-19 pandemic delayed many of the events for qualifying for rowing.

Competition format

This rowing event is a double scull event, meaning that each boat is propelled by two rowers. The "scull" portion means that the rower uses two oars, one on each side of the boat; this contrasts with sweep rowing in which each rower has one oar and rows on only one side. The competition consists of multiple rounds. The competition continues to use the three-round format. Finals are held to determine the placing of each boat. The course uses the 2000 metres distance that became the Olympic standard in 1912.

During the first round three heats were held. The first three boats in each heat advanced to the semifinals, with the others relegated to the repechage.

The repechage offered rowers a second chance to qualify for the semifinals. Placing in the repechage determined which semifinal the boat would race in. The top three boats in the repechage moved on to the semifinals, with the remaining boats eliminated.

Two semifinal heats were held, each with 6 boats. The top three boats from each heat advanced to Final A and competed for a medal. The remaining boats advanced to Final B.

The third and final round is the finals. Each final determined a set of rankings. The A final determined the medals, along with the rest of the places through 6th, while the B final gave rankings from 7th to 12th.

Schedule

The competition was held over six days.

All times are Japan Standard Time (UTC+9)

Results

Heats
The first three of each heat qualified for the semifinals, while the remainder went to the repechage.

Heat 1

Heat 2

Heat 3

Repechage
The first three pairs in the repechage qualified for the semifinals, while the fourth pair was eliminated.

Semifinals

The first three of each heat qualify to the Final A, other to Final B

Semifinal A/B 1

Semifinal A/B 2

Finals

Final B

Final A

References

Women's double sculls
Women's events at the 2020 Summer Olympics